Events from the year 1884 in France.

Incumbents
President: Jules Grévy 
President of the Council of Ministers: Jules Ferry

Events
 7 March – Eugène Poubelle introduces the dustbin to Paris.
 June – At Bắc Lệ, Chinese forces attack a French column sent to occupy Tonkin in accordance with earlier treaties, starting the Sino-French War.
 6 June – Treaty of Hué is signed between representatives of Vietnam and the French Empire.
 23 August – Battle of Fuzhou: Admiral Amédée Courbet's Far East Squadron virtually destroys China's Fujian Fleet.
 1 October – French begin occupation of Keelung (Jilong).
 23 November – Siege of Tuyên Quang begins in Indochina: The French Foreign Legion is besieged by forces of the Empire of China.

Arts and literature
 29 July – Société des Artistes Indépendants is founded in Paris.

Births

January to June
 5 January – Arnaud Denjoy, mathematician (died 1974)
 7 February – Achille Liénart, Cardinal (died 1973)
 24 March – Eugène-Gabriel-Gervais-Laurent Tisserant, Cardinal (died 1972)
 26 March – Paul Legentilhomme, military officer (died 1975)
 31 March – Henri Queuille, Radical-Socialist politician and Prime Minister of France (died 1970)
 5 May – Jean Decoux, Governor-General of French Indochina (died 1963)
 13 June – Étienne Gilson, Thomistic philosopher and historian of philosophy (died 1978)
 18 June – Édouard Daladier, Radical-Socialist politician and Prime Minister of France (died 1970)
 19 June – Georges Ribemont-Dessaignes, writer and artist (died 1974)
 27 June – Gaston Bachelard, philosopher (died 1962)
 30 June – Georges Duhamel, author (died 1966)

July to December
 4 July – Pauline Carton, actress (died 1974)
 7 July – André Dunoyer de Segonzac, painter and graphic artist (died 1974)
 10 July – Pierre Larquey, actor (died 1962)
 12 July – Edgar Stehli, French-born American actor (died 1973)
 3 August – Georges Boillot, motor racing driver and World War I fighter pilot (died 1916)
 25 August – Léon Poirier, film director, screenwriter and film producer (died 1968)
 27 August – Vincent Auriol, politician, President of France (died 1966)
 4 September – Henri Meslot, athlete (died 1973)
 24 September – Gustave Garrigou, cyclist, 1911 Tour de France winner (died 1963)
 25 September – Rita Jolivet, American-born actress (died 1971)
 4 October – Félix Gouin, politician (died 1977)
 27 October – André Le Troquer, politician and lawyer (died 1963)
 2 December – Jean Paulhan, writer, literary critic and publisher (died 1968)

Full date unknown
 Jacques Maroger, painter (died 1962)

Deaths
 3 February – Eugène Rouher, statesman (born 1814)
 4 April – Adolphe Dugléré, chef (born 1805)
 10 April – Jean-Baptiste Dumas, chemist (born 1800)
 6 May
 Judah P. Benjamin, American-born Jewish United States Senator from Louisiana from 1853 to 1861 (born 1811)
 Marie-Alphonse Ratisbonne, Jew who became a Jesuit Catholic priest and missionary (born 1814)
 10 September – Jean-Augustin Barral, agronomist (born 1819)
 13 December – Eugène Pelletan, writer, journalist and politician (born 1813)

References

1880s in France